Swietopelk II, also Zwantepolc II or Swantopolk II, (1190/1200 – 11 January 1266), sometimes known as the Great (Kashubian: Swiãtopôłk II Wiôldżi), was the ruling Duke of Pomerelia-Gdańsk from 1215 until his death. He was the first member of the Samborides to style himself dux from 1227 onwards.

Names

The duke is known under many spellings (Swantepolk, Swantipolk, Svatopluk, Swietopelk, Swatopolk, Sviatopolk, Światopełek, Świętopełk, Swiãtopôłk), of which Domin(us) Zwantepolc(us) D(ux) Danceke and Svantopelc Ducis Pomeranie were used on seals.

Biography
Swietopelk was the son of the Pomeranian duke Mestwin I and his wife Swinisława. His father had ruled over Eastern Pomerania (or Pomerelia) since about 1205 by appointment of the Polish high duke Władysław III Spindleshanks. In 1216 or 1217 his son Swietopelk was made a steward over Pomerelia by High Duke Leszek I the White of Kraków. He was responsible for the Gdańsk territory, the largest of the four portions of Pomerelia. In 1218, Swietopelk took advantage of a revolt of local knights against Danish rule to occupy the Lands of Schlawe and Stolp. After his brother Warcislaw died without heirs, Swietopelk took over his Lubiszewo Tczewskie.

Upon their father's death, Swietopelk's  brothers Sambor and Racibor were still young, so he acted as their guardian.  As they came of age, the brothers received their share of inheritance: Sambor received Lubiszewo Tczewskie and Racibor received Białogard.

Swietopelk, who had exploited Piast Poland's fragmentation to gain independence, promised Władysław Odonic the throne of Kraków and Silesia in exchange for his support in the ousting of Leszek and Henry I the Bearded of Lower Silesia . On 23 November 1227, on the occasion of an assembly of Piast dukes in Gąsawa, Leszek was killed in an ambush set by Swietopelk II and perhaps Władysław, while Henry was severely wounded.

In 1233-34, Swietopelk II, with his brother Sambor, joined a crusading army along with Hermann Balk, Konrad I of Masovia, Henry the Bearded, and Władysław Odonic. They proceeded to Kwidzyn (Marienwerder) and refortified it for the Teutonic Order. After this task was over, the crusaders met the pagan Prussians, the Pomesanians, at the battle of the River Sorge. There, they defeated the pagans, and were able to seize greater control of south Prussia.

In 1238 Swietopelk conquered the Duchy of Pomerania-Schlawe, whose territories connected Pomerania to Gdańsk, Nakło, and Bydgoszcz. This guaranteed war with Kujavia. The brothers, over whom Swantopolk was supposed to govern for twenty years, refused to support their overlord after twelve years, and the conflict escalated into a civil war. Sambor and Racibor were driven out from their lands and sought refuge and alliance first with Piast relatives in Greater Poland, later with the Teutonic Knights, a Christian military order waging a crusade against pagan Prussians. There were also economic tensions between the Knights and Swantopolk. This resulted in an alliance with the heathen Prussians. Swantopolk played a key role in the First Prussian Uprising, which started in 1242.

The alliance between the pagan Prussians and the Christian Swietopelk against a religious order supported by the pope was unexpected. Swietopelk was previously known as a supporter of the Roman Catholic Church and Christian causes. Eventually, the uprising did not succeed and a peace treaty, mediated by a papal legate, was signed on 24 November 1248. Swietopelk had to return lands seized from his brothers, allow Teutonic Knights to pass through his domains, stop charging tolls on ships using the Vistula, and stop any aid to the Prussians. He kept his word and did not assist the Prussians during their Great Uprising (1260–1274).

After governing since 1220 for 46 years, Swietopelk died in 1266, with his sons Mestwin II and Wartislaw II inheriting his lands.

Family

Marriages
 1217/1218 Eufrozyna († 1230), daughter of Odon, duke of Greater Poland (she was his sister's sister in law and half-cousin through Mieszko III the Old )
 before 1252 (?) Ermengarda (Ermengardis, † after 1270), daughter of Henry I of Schwerin, Count of Schwerin.

Children
 Mestwin II (c.1220–1294), duke of Świecie (Schwetz) and later Gdańsk (Danzig)
 Wartislaw II (c.1237–1271), duke of Gdańsk 
 Euphemia (c.1225–1270), married to Jaromar II, prince of Rugia
 John (about 1230–1248), died at a young age.
 unknown daughter, married to a Count of Kevenberg

References
Specific

General

 

12th-century births
1266 deaths
Dukes of Pomerania
Christians of the Prussian Crusade
Samborides